Camilo Andrés Mena Márquez (born 1 October 2002) is a Colombian professional footballer who plays as a forward for Polish club Jagiellonia Białystok, on loan from Valmiera FC. He was included in The Guardian's "Next Generation 2019".

Career statistics

Club

Notes

References

2002 births
Living people
Sportspeople from Antioquia Department
Colombian footballers
Colombia youth international footballers
Association football forwards
Tigres F.C. footballers
Deportivo Pereira footballers
Valmieras FK players
Jagiellonia Białystok players
Categoría Primera B players
Categoría Primera A players
Latvian Higher League players

Colombian expatriate footballers
Expatriate footballers in Latvia
Colombian expatriate sportspeople in Latvia
Expatriate footballers in Poland
Colombian expatriate sportspeople in Poland